Ōsawa, Osawa or Oosawa (written:  or  lit. "big swamp") is a Japanese surname. Notable people with the surname include:

, Japanese ice hockey player
Eiji Osawa (born 1935), Japanese chemist
Itsumi Osawa (born 1966), Japanese actress, writer and singer
Kenji Osawa (born 1976), Japanese mixed martial artist
Kisaburo Osawa (1910–1991), Japanese aikidoka
Masaaki Ōsawa (born 1946), Japanese politician and governor of Gunma Prefecture
Masayo Ōsawa (1913–1945), Japanese diver
, Japanese swimmer
Reiko Ōsawa (born 1915), Japanese diver
Shigeki Osawa (born 1986), Japanese mixed martial artist
Shinichi Osawa (born 1967), Japanese musician better known as Mondo Grosso
Takao Osawa (born 1968), Japanese actor

See also
19310 Osawa, an asteroid
Ōsawa Station (disambiguation)
Ozawa

Japanese-language surnames